Racinaea steyermarkii is a plant species in the genus Racinaea. This species is native to Venezuela.

References

steyermarkii
Flora of Venezuela